The Espírito Santo blind snake (Trilepida salgueiroi) is a species of snake in the family Leptotyphlopidae. The species is endemic to Brazil.

Etymology
The specific name, salgueiroi, is in honor of W.S. Salgueiro who collected the holotype.

Geographic range
T. salgueiroi is found in the Brazilian states of Bahia, Espírito Santo, Minas Gerais, and Rio de Janeiro.

Habitat
The preferred natural habitats of T. salgueiroi are forest and shrubland.

Description
Dorsally, T. salgueiroi is uniform dark brown. Ventrally, it is light brown, with a reticulate pattern formed by white scale edges.

Reproduction
T. salgueiroi is oviparous.

References

Further reading
Adalsteinsson SA, Branch WR, Trape S, Vitt LJ, Hedges SB (2009). "Molecular phylogeny, classification, and biogeography of snakes of the family Leptotyphlopidae (Reptilia, Squamata)". Zootaxa 2244: 1-50. (Tricheilostoma salgueiroi, new combination).
Amaral A ("1954" [1955]). "Contribução ao conhecimento dos ofídios neotrópicos: 14. Descrição de duas espécies novas de 'cobra-cega' (fam. Leptotyphlopidae) ". Memórias do Instituto Butantan, São Paulo 26: 203–205. (Leptotyphlops salgueiroi, new species, p. 203). (in Portuguese).
Hedges, S. Blair (2011). "The type species of the threadsnake genus Tricheilostoma Jan revisited (Squamata, Leptotyphlopidae)". Zootaxa 3027: 63–64. (Trilepida salgueiroi, new combination, p. 63).

Trilepida
Reptiles described in 1955